Pipiza noctiluca is a species of Hoverfly, from the family Syrphidae, in the order Diptera.

Description
External images
For terms see Morphology of Diptera Wing length 6.5 -8mm. Tarsae1: segments 1-2 yellowish; face broadened towards mouth edge with eye margins divergent. Wing: dark cloud at median.3rd segment as long as wide. Abdomen yellow spots with small or abdomen entirely grey black.
See references for determination.

Distribution
Palearctic Atlantic zone of Europe and Scandinavia. All Europe if older records are accepted

Biology
Habitat: Salix stands and Quercus woodland, Atlantic scrub, conifer forest, conifer plantations. Suburban gardens and along hedges in farmland.
Flowers visited include umbellifers, Crataegus, Filipendula, Ranunculus, Rosa, Stellaria, Taraxacum. Flies May to September. Pipiza larvae are predators of gall forming aphids.

References

Diptera of Europe
Pipizinae
Flies described in 1758
Taxa named by Carl Linnaeus